The canton of Flayosc is an administrative division of the Var department, southeastern France. It was created at the French canton reorganisation which came into effect in March 2015. Its seat is in Flayosc.

It consists of the following communes:

Aiguines
Ampus
Artignosc-sur-Verdon
Aups
Bargème
Bargemon
La Bastide
Baudinard-sur-Verdon
Bauduen
Le Bourguet
Brenon
Callas
Châteaudouble
Châteauvieux
Claviers
Comps-sur-Artuby
Figanières
Flayosc
Fox-Amphoux
La Martre
Moissac-Bellevue
Montferrat
Montmeyan
La Motte
Régusse
La Roque-Esclapon
Salernes
Les Salles-sur-Verdon
Sillans-la-Cascade
Tavernes
Tourtour
Trigance
Vérignon
Villecroze

References

Cantons of Var (department)